General elections were held in the Cayman Islands on 8 November 2000. The elections saw the ruling National Team under Truman Bodden suffer a heavy defeat, with Bodden losing his seat. Following the elections, Kurt Tibbetts of the Democratic Alliance was elected as the Leader of Government Business.

Campaign
Caymananian elections were traditionally contested on a non-partisan basis, with candidates running as independents and or in groupings known as teams. In the August 1991 a grouping known as the Progressive Democratic Party emerged, and constituted the first substantive Cayman political organisation since the 1960s. The party renamed itself as the National Team, and won power in the 1992 elections.

Major issues in the election campaign included the Islands' constitutional status, immigration, housing, and environmental protection.

Results
John McLean, Agriculture Minister, lost his seat to his cousin, Arden McLean.

Aftermath
The United Democratic Party (UDP) was formed in November 2001, and would oust Tibbetts as Leader of Government Business that month in a vote of 9 to 5. Tibbett's would be replaced as Leader of Government Business by McKeeva Bush of the UDP. Tibbett's was elected as leader of the new opposition party, the People's Progressive Movement, in May 2002. The party would go on to win the 2005 general election.

References

Elections in the Cayman Islands
Cayman
2000 in the Cayman Islands
2000 elections in British Overseas Territories
November 2000 events in North America
Election and referendum articles with incomplete results